Yusuf Maitama Sule  (1 October 1929 – 3 July 2017) was a Nigerian politician, diplomat, and elderly statesman who held the Ɗanmasanin Kano a chieftaincy title. In 1955-1956 he was the chief whip of the Federal House of Representatives. In 1960 he led the Nigerian delegation to the Conference of Independent African States.  In 1976, he became the Federal Commissioner of public complaints, a position that made him the nation's pioneer ombudsman. In early 1979, he was the presidential candidate of the National Party of Nigeria but lost to Shehu Shagari. He was appointed Nigeria's representative to the United Nations after the coming of civilian rule in September 1979. While there he was chairman of the United Nations Special Committee against Apartheid.

After the re-election of President Shagari in 1983, Maitama Sule was made the Minister for National Guidance, a portfolio designed to assist the president in tackling corruption.

Career

Public Complaints Commission
The rise of economic nationalism during the 1970s led to the enactment of a decree stipulating minimum requirements for local content in many companies doing business in Nigeria. To capitalize on the benefits of indigenous control of the economy, many permanent secretaries, federal commissioners, state governors and their cronies established firms to conduct business with the government. It was with the intent of patching the  revolving door and to stem small-time corruption that the Public Complaints Commission was created in 1975. It was meant to hear and tackle complaints by the common man in a simple and efficient manner. Sule, as head of the commission, was known to have taken his job seriously, partly because he was a potent political commodity and had a lot to gain from the good will of the people when a transition to civilian rule was in place. As a result of the commission's effort, corruption during the period was temporarily curtailed.

National guidance
In 1983, Sule returned to a familiar role, this time under a democratic government as the head of a ministry to tackle corruption. The new but short-lived ministry was created solely to invest time in an ethical re-orientation of Nigerians. Sule, who had acquired a solid reputation as a tough U.N representative when he was chairman of a U.N. special committee on apartheid, was asked to lead the ministry. However, his appointment was not satisfactory to critics. Shagari's administration was removed by a coup, with the coupists citing corruption as a major reason for the incursion.

Polemical statement
Alhaji Yusuf Maitama Sule said, 

The aforementioned statement has been used by some to stir up fears of northern political domination in the country. The fear of northern dominance can however not be dismissed.

"May God give this country leaders not rulers, leaders with the fear of God."

Death
Sule died on 2 July 2017 in a hospital in Cairo, Egypt, after suffering from pneumonia and a chest infection.

References

1929 births
2017 deaths
People from Kano
Candidates for President of Nigeria
National Party of Nigeria politicians
Federal ministers of Nigeria
Permanent Representatives of Nigeria to the United Nations